Dato' Zamri bin Yusuf is a Malaysian politician and former Kedah State Executive Councillor.

Election results

Honours
  :
 Darjah Dato' Setia Sultan Sallehuddin Kedah (DSSS) - Dato' (2019)

References 

Living people
People from Kedah
Malaysian people of Malay descent
 People's Justice Party (Malaysia) politicians
21st-century Malaysian politicians
Year of birth missing (living people)
Members of the Kedah State Legislative Assembly
 Kedah state executive councillors